Bo John Fredrik Warg (born May 3, 1979 in Skellefteå, Sweden) is a retired forward who last played for the ERC Ingolstadt hockey team in Austria. He also played for Björklöven, Modo and Timrå IK.
He reached an agreement with Dinamo Riga of KHL and joined his fellow countryman Björn Melin for 11-12 season.

External links

References 

 Warg retires

1979 births
Living people
Swedish ice hockey centres
Skellefteå AIK players
Modo Hockey players
Timrå IK players
IF Björklöven players
Dinamo Riga players
People from Skellefteå Municipality
Sportspeople from Västerbotten County